Gangaw Township is a township of Gangaw District in the Magway Division of Myanmar.  The principal town is Gangaw. The capital city of Gangaw District is Pakokku.

Townships of Magway Region